Định Quán is a rural district of Đồng Nai province in the Southeast region of Vietnam. As of 2003 the district had a population of 214,321. The district covers an area of 967 km². The district capital lies at Định Quán.

Administrative subdivisions 
This district is mostly rural, with the following xã:
Định Quán town (thị trấn)
Xã Thanh Sơn
Xã Phú Tân
Xã Phú Vinh
Xã Ngọc Định
Xã La Ngà
Xã Phú Lợi
Xã Phú Hoà
Xã Gia Canh
Xã Phú Ngọc
Xã Túc Trưng
Xã Phú Cường
Xã Phú Túc
Xã Suối Nho.

References

Districts of Đồng Nai province